James Harper Prowse Jr.  (November 3, 1913 – September 27, 1976), was a politician, barrister and solicitor from Alberta, Canada.  He served in the Legislative Assembly of Alberta from 1945 to 1959, first as an independent and then as a Liberal. He led the Alberta Liberal Party from 1948 to 1958 and served as a senator from 1966 until his death in 1976.

Early life
James Harper Prowse Jr. was born in Taber, Alberta, on November 3, 1913. He took his post-secondary education at the University of Alberta.

World War II
Prowse enlisted in the Canadian Army in 1940. He served five years overseas during the Second World War, mostly in the Italian Campaign, and rose to the rank of captain.  He was wounded twice during combat. His army career ended after he was elected to the Alberta Legislature in the 1945 service vote.

Provincial politics
Prowse had been introduced to politics at a young age when his father, James Harper Prowse Sr., ran for a seat to the Alberta Legislature in the 1926 general election in the electoral district of Taber.

Prowse first ran for a seat in the legislature in the 1945 serviceman vote that was the last stage of the general election held the previous year. He ran as a candidate in the army vote and won the polls with 17% of the popular vote over 21 other candidates on February 5, 1945. The vote was non-partisan so Prowse sat as an independent in the legislature.

After winning the election and returning to Edmonton, Prowse became a journalist for the Edmonton Bulletin. He crossed the floor to the Liberals after announcing his intention to run for the leadership of the party on April 10, 1947. He said of his decision, "The political situation has reached a point where there is no longer any advantage to be gained by remaining neutral."

Prowse was elected leader of the party on the first ballot at the Liberals' annual convention on June 26, 1947. The convention was attended by 476 delegates. He defeated two other candidates, Jonathan Wheatly and Joseph Tremblay.

The serviceman seats were abolished after the end of the Second World War, and Prowse decided to contest a seat in the Edmonton electoral district in the 1948 Alberta election. He took the fourth of five seats in the multi-member district. The Liberal party won one other seat besides his own and took 17% of the popular vote.

In the 1952 Alberta general election Prowse won the second seat in Edmonton. He led the Liberals to four seats and 22% of the popular vote.

In the 1955 general election the Liberals made their best showing in decades, winning 15 seats and earning 31% of the popular vote. Prowse again took the second seat in Edmonton.

Prowse stepped down as leader of the Liberal party in 1958 and retired from the legislature at dissolution in 1959. He did not run in the 1959 provincial election.

He ran for mayor of Edmonton in the 1959 municipal election; he lost to Elmer Roper.

Federal politics
Prowse first ran for a seat to the House of Commons of Canada in the 1962 federal election in the electoral district of Edmonton West as a candidate for the Liberal Party of Canada. He finished a close second to incumbent Marcel Lambert and ahead of former Member of Parliament Orvis Kennedy.

The minority parliament was dissolved less than a year later and so came the 1963 federal election. Prowse ran again in Edmonton West but still finished behind Lambert.

Prowse was appointed to the Senate of Canada on the advice of Prime Minister Lester Pearson in 1967.  He represented Edmonton there until his death on September 27, 1976.

References

External links
Legislative Assembly of Alberta Members Listing

1913 births
1976 deaths
Independent Alberta MLAs
Leaders of the Alberta Liberal Party
Alberta Liberal Party MLAs
Candidates in the 1962 Canadian federal election
Candidates in the 1963 Canadian federal election
Canadian senators from Alberta
Canadian military personnel of World War II
Liberal Party of Canada senators
People from Taber, Alberta
University of Alberta alumni
Liberal Party of Canada candidates for the Canadian House of Commons